Ananteris balzanii is a scorpion species found in Argentina, Paraguay and Brazil. It is the type species of the Ananteris genus.

References 

Buthidae
Animals described in 1891
Scorpions of South America
Fauna of Argentina
Fauna of Brazil
Fauna of Paraguay
Taxa named by Tamerlan Thorell